Lanterne may refer to:
 Lanterne (pasta), a type of pasta
 Lanterne (poem), a form of poetry
 Lanterne (river), in eastern France